Eğripınar is a village in the Ovacık District, Tunceli Province, Turkey. The village is populated by Kurds of the Kalan tribe and had a population of 281 in 2021.

The hamlet of Bozkır is attached to the village.

References 

Kurdish settlements in Tunceli Province
Villages in Ovacık District